Peter Oscar Stribolt  (12 February 1872 – 20 May 1927) was a Danish stage and film actor of the silent era in Denmark. He worked prolifically under director Lau Lauritzen Sr.

Selected filmography
Häxan (English release titles: The Witches and Witchcraft Through The Ages) (1922)
Kong Bukseløs (English release title: His New Grey Trousers) (1915)
Familien Pille som Spejdere (English release title: She Would Be a Scout) (1915)
En slem Dreng (1915)
De besejrede Pebersvende (1914)
Afgrunden (English: The Abyss) (1910)

External links

Oscar Stribolt at www.danskefilm.dk

Danish male actors
1872 births
1927 deaths
Danish male film actors
Danish male silent film actors
20th-century Danish male actors
Danish male stage actors